Badminton had its debut as an official event on the  1992 Summer Olympics and has been contested in eight Olympiads. 74 different nations have appeared in the Olympic badminton competitions, with 18 appearing all eight times. It is governed by the Badminton World Federation.

Summary

History
The 1972 Summer Olympics saw the inaugural staging of badminton, as a demonstration sport. Two decades later the sport was officially introduced to the Olympics in 1989, and debuted in competition at the 1992 Games where 4 events were held, with singles and doubles events for both men and women. Four medals were awarded in each event, including two bronzes. At the following Games in 1996, had 5 events with the addition of mixed doubles. Since 1996 there is a playoff between the two semi-final losers to determine the sole winner of the bronze medal. This format has continued to 2020 Olympics.

Events
(d) = demonstration event(e) = exhibition event

Medal table

Successful national teams
Below is the gold medalists showed based on category and countries after the 2020 Summer Olympics. China has been successfully dominating the Summer Olympics, it is the only country ever to achieve a shutout of the medals, which they did at the 2012 Summer Olympics. Indonesia is the second most successful country in Badminton sports after China at the Olympics event. China and Indonesia are the only countries that have ever won gold medals in every badminton discipline. Bolded numbers below indicate a country as the overall winner of Olympic badminton of that year.

Medal summary by event

Men's singles

Women's singles

Men's doubles

Women's doubles

Mixed doubles

Qualification
The Badminton World Federation's ranking list is used to determine qualification for the Olympic tournament.  For singles, 29 competitors are selected.  For doubles, 19 pairs are selected.

The general method of selection is by ranking, though the selection process stops once all qualification positions are filled.  All players or pairs from the top 16 places on that list qualify, though each National Olympic Committee can send a maximum of three players/pairs.  Players and pairs through the 64th place on that ranking qualify, with the caveat that each NOC can send only two players/pairs from that portion of the list.  Players and pairs ranked below that only qualify if they are the highest-ranked competitor from their nation.

In addition, one place in each of the singles events is awarded by the Tripartite Commission.  There are also regulations on minimum representation.  Each continent must have at least one player/pair.  This is the highest-ranked player/pair from that continent if none have qualified through the standard selection process.  The host nation, if it has not already qualified two competitors, receives two slots as well, either two singles players or one pair.

Competition
Olympic badminton consists of a group stage and single-elimination tournament.  Each match is played to the best of three games.  Games are up to 21 points.  Rally scoring is used, meaning a player does not need to be serving to score.  A player must win by two points or be the first player to 30 points.

Participating nations
The following nations have taken part in the badminton competition. The numbers in the table indicate the number of competitors sent to that year's Olympics.

See also
Badminton at the Summer Paralympics
List of Olympic venues in badminton

References

External links
 International Olympic Committee – Badminton World Federation
 Badminton World Federation

 
Sports at the Summer Olympics
Olympics